Trapezites symmomus is a butterfly of the family Hesperiidae. It is found in Queensland, Victoria, South Australia and New South Wales.

The wingspan is about 50 mm.

The larvae feed on Lomandra hystrix, Lomandra longifolia, Lomandra obliqua, Lomandra spicata and Romnalda strobilacea.

Subspecies
Trapezites symmomus sombra (Tablelands of northern Queensland)
Trapezites symmomus sommomus (Southern Queensland and New South Wales) 
Trapezites symmomus soma (Victoria and South Australia)

Gallery

External links
 Australian Caterpillars

Trapezitinae
Butterflies described in 1823